Isojärvi is a lake in Finland. It is situated in the municipality of Kuhmoinen and for a lesser part in the municipality of Jämsä in the Central Finland region. The lake is a part of the Kymijoki basin and drains into the lake Päijänne. The Isojärvi National Park is located by the lake.

External links
Finnish Environment Institute: Lakes in Finland

Kymi basin
Kuhmoinen
Landforms of Central Finland
Lakes of Jämsä